Agonum darlingtoni is a species of black coloured ground beetle from Platyninae subfamily, that can be found in the United States and Canada.

References

External links
Agonum darlingtoni on Bug Guide

Beetles described in 1954
darlingtoni
Beetles of North America